Anomologa demens is a species of moth in the family Gelechiidae. It was described by Edward Meyrick in 1926. It is found in South Africa.

The wingspan is about 21 mm. The forewings are purple-blackish. The hindwings are dark gray.

References

Endemic moths of South Africa
Anomologini
Moths described in 1926
Moths of Africa